Simeulue Timur (East Simeulue) is a district of the Simeulue Regency on Simeulue island in the Indonesian province of Aceh. At the 2010 census, it had a total population of 28,931 people, living in 4,334 households in 2005. In 2020, after being reduced in 2012, it covered 175.97 km2 and had a population of 27,569 at the 2020 Census.

Administrative divisions
As at 2010, Simeulue Timur was divided administratively into 29 villages (/kelurahan.) However, in 2012 twelve of these  were split off to form a new district of Teupah Tengah (Central Teupah). The remaining 17  are:

Air Dingin
Air Pinang
Amaiteng Mulia
Ameria Bahagia
Ganting
Kota Batu
Kuala Makmur
Linggi
Lugu
Pulau Siumat
Sefoyan
Sinabang
Suak Buluh
Suka Jaya
Suka Karya
Suka Maju
Ujung Tinggi

References

Districts of Aceh